The University of Medicine 1, Yangon (formerly the Institute of Medicine 1), located in Yangon, it is the oldest medical school in Myanmar. The university offers M.B., B.S. (equivalent of the M.D.) degrees and graduate (diploma, master's and doctoral) degrees in medical science. The university is perhaps the most selective university in the country, and admits approximately 400 students annually based on their University Entrance Examination scores.

The University of Medicine 1 comprises three campuses: Lanmadaw campus (also known as St. John's), Pyay Road campus (also known as Leikkhon) and Thaton Road campus (former BOC College of Engineering and Mining).

University of Medicine 1, Yangon is one of five schools in Myanmar recognized by the Educational Commission for Foreign Medical Graduates.

History

The history of the University of Medicine 1 began with the establishment of the government medical schools in Myanmar in 1907 at the premises of the old Rangoon General Hospital, and the introduction of a course in medical sciences. It was a four-year medical course known as Licentiate Medical Practice (LMP) course and the successful candidates were offered certificate of license for medical practice. In 1923–1924, the Bachelor of Medicine and Bachelor of Surgery (M.B., B.S.) course was introduced at the old Rangoon College building at the site of the present Neurology Department of the Yangon General Hospital. Then, the main building of the University of Medicine 1 was built and the foundation stone was laid by Sir Harcourt Butler on 2 February 1927. The classes were transferred to the new building in 1929.

The medical college became a constituent college of the Rangoon University in 1930 and was placed under the Board of Administration, on which the Vice-chancellor of the University of Rangoon and the Inspector General of Civil Hospital served as Chairman and Vice-chairman respectively. Academic matters and general administration were attended to by the principal with the help of the Medical College Council(Academic Body).

In 1937, the medical degree,  M.B., B.S. (Rgn), conferred by the University of Rangoon gained recognition of the General Medical Council of Great Britain. From 1942 to 1945, during World War II, there was a temporary suspension of the M.B., B.S. course. A modified course was conducted instead, on the successful completion of which the Licentiate of the State Medical Board (L.S.M.B.) was conferred. Although the medical college building remained intact, all the laboratory equipment, and all the mounts and specimens collected in the Pathology and Forensic Medicine Department Museums were completely destroyed, and valuable books from the College library were also lost.

After the war, all the constituent colleges of the reconstituted Rangoon University became Faculties, and the Medical College became the Faculty of Medicine, under the administration of the Dean.

On promulgation of the University Education Act in May 1964, the Institutes of Medicine were established. In 1973, the administration of the three medical Institutes and the Institute of Dental Medicine was transferred to the Ministry of Health, and came under the direct control of the Department of Medical Education, now known as the Department of Health Manpower.

Post-graduate courses were introduced at the three Institutes of Medicine in 1964, the Dean of the courses being responsible to the Rector for their organization and administration. With the addition of new courses in 1970, the Board of Postgraduate Medical Studies came under the administration of the Director. With the institution of the Department of Medical Education in 1973, the Board has been under the direct charge of the Director-General of the Department of Medical Education, now known as the Department of Human Resource for Health. In 2005, Institute of Medicine 1 was renamed the University of Medicine 1.

Leadership
From 1930 to 1941, the university became Medical College under University of Rangoon headed by principals, all of whom were Indian Medical Service (IMS) officers.

1930–31: Lt. Col. T.F. Owens
1931–33: Lt. Col. L.A.H. Lack
1933–38: Lt. Col. R.V. Morrison
1938–39: Lt. Col. R.H. Malone
1939–41: Major G.M. Irvine

From 1946 to 1964, the university became the Faculty of Medicine under University of Rangoon headed by Deans.

1946–47: William Burridge 
1947–48: Lt. Col. Min Sein
1948–49: Ba Than
1949–51: Min Sein
1951–53: Ba Than
1953–55: Min Sein
1955–57: Ba Than
1957–59: Min Sein
1959–64: Maung Gale

Since 1964, the university has been headed by an academic dean known as a rector. Past rectors have included:

1964–1971: Ba Than
1971–1972: Pe Kyin
1972–1984: Tun Min
1984–1987: Hla Myint
1987–1988: Tin Aung Swe
1988–1991: Maung Maung Sein
1991–1996: Mya Oo
1996–1997: Kyaw Myint Tun
1997–1998: Kyaw Myint
1998–2007: Myo Myint
2007–2009: Aye Maung Han
2009–2011: Pe Thet Khin
2011–2013: Than Cho
2013–2015: Thet Khine Win
2015–present: Zaw Wai Soe

Coursework
The M.B., B.S. course work extends over seven years.

Subjects

Foundation year
Burmese
English
Mathematics & statistics
Physics
Chemistry
Botany
Zoology

Medical first year
Anatomy
Physiology
Biochemistry

Medical second year
General pathology
Microbiology
Pharmacology

Students are also posted for 18 weeks each to the medical and surgical wards for clinical training.

Final year (Part I)
Forensic Medicine
Preventive and Social Medicine (with three weeks residential field training in the rural areas).
Systemic Pathology and haematology

Students attend lectures & clinics in Medicine, Surgery, Child health, Obstetrics & gynecology, and are posted to the various teaching hospitals, including Urban Health facilities as part of Preventive and Social Medicine teaching.

Final year (Part II)
Child Health
Medicine
Obstetrics & Gynaecology
Surgery

Students study the allied specialties, namely, eye, ear, nose & throat diseases, urology, neurology, tuberculosis, venereal diseases, orthopaedics and traumatology, skin diseases, mental health and psychiatry, orthomaxillo-facial surgery, radiology, radiotherapy, nuclear medicine, anesthesiology, thoracic surgery, and paediatric surgery.

A summative examination is held at the end of the Final M.B., B.S.Part II course. Problem Based Learning (PBL), Community Based Learning (CBL) and Behavioural Science will be incorporated, as relevant, in the M.B., B.S. course.

House surgeon training

All students, after successful completion of Final Part II examination, are continued to train hands-on for period of one year as house surgeons in the recognized Teaching Hospitals in Yangon and / or the State and Division Hospitals. Training Periods are as following: -

Only after completion of house-surgeonship M.B., B.S. Degree is offered to the students. Before 1997, the degree was conferred upon completion of the second part of the final year.

Improvements and changes

M.B., B.S. COURSE (1930)

Yangon University passed a new curriculum for M.B., B.S. degree course with a slight alteration in program structure of 1923 curriculum. There was no change in 1st M.B., course. The teaching of Physical and Organic chemistry in second M.B. course was shortened to six months.

The 3rd M.B., B.S. course was of one-year duration and consisted of:
 Materia medica and Pharmacology
 General and Special Pathology including Medical Zoology and Bacteriology
 Morbid Anatomy including attendance to all post-mortem examination for three months.
 Morbid Histology
 Elementary Bacteriology and Medical Zoology
 Clinical clerkship

The final M.B., B.S. course was two years and it was divided into two parts (The Final Part I and the Final Part II M.B., B.S.):
The subjects taught in the Final Part I course were:

 Forensic Medicine (including medico-legal post-mortem examination)
 Hygiene and vaccination (including Practical Hygiene).

The examination was held at the end of one year.

The course leading to Part II of the final M.B., B.S. examination was as follows:
 Systemic Medicine
 Systemic Surgery
 Systemic Midwifery
 Applied anatomy and physiology
 Outpatient clerkship - 4 months
 Special Departments

Three months - Eye, Ear, Nose and Throat
Two months - Venereal Diseases & Skin
 Maternity Hospital - 3 months
 Clinical clerkship in medicine & Surgery

To fulfil the regulation of General Medical Council of Great Britain the instructions on child welfare, prenatal care and causes of excessive infantile mortality had to be included.

The candidate who failed in any one of the M.B., B.S. examinations could transfer himself to L.M. & S. course, if desired to do so. But candidates who had passed the L.M. & S. course were not granted any concession to enable them to follow a modified course leading to the degree of M.B., B.S.

The General Medical Council of Great Britain was again requested to reconsider the University's application for the recognition of its M.B., B.S. Degree as registrable qualification in Great Britain. The Committee of the General Medical Council informed the University that it was not expedient or just to accede to the request of the University.

M.B., B.S. COURSE (1935–36)

The prospectus of the Medical College of the University of Rangoon (1935–1936) stated that the duration of M.B., B.S. course was seven years (previously six years) from the time of matriculation - two years of pre-medical and five years of medical studies proper.

A candidate for admission into Medical College, had to pass the First M.B., B.S. course that normally extended over two years or one of the examinations recognized by the General Medical Council of Great Britain as prerequisite education.

There was no change in Second M.B., B.S. course but the subjects taught in clinical years were rearranged as follows:

The Third M.B., B.S.
 Materia Medica & Pharmacology
 Bacteriology & Medical Zoology
The Final Part I M.B., B.S.
 Pathology
 Forensic Medicine
 Hygiene and Public health
The Final Part II M.B., B.S.
 Medicine
 Surgery
 Obstetrics & Gynaecology

In the previous curriculum, Bacteriology and Medical Zoology were taught under Pathology in Third M.B., B.S. course. The teaching of Pathology was carried out in the Final Part I in 1935-36 curriculum.

Some of the rules for the students stated that the students who were absent without leave would be removed from the college and no student would be allowed to sit for a University Examination unless his attendance, work and conduct had been certified to be satisfactory by the Professor or Lecturer in each subject for which the student was appearing for the examination.

During the three years of clinical study, (i.e. starting from Third M.B., B.S.) the students had to work in the outpatient departments and the wards of the Rangoon General Hospital, and attend post-mortem examinations, clinics and surgical operations. They performed clinical duties under the supervision of the members of the staff of hospital who were also staff of the Medical College. The students were posted for a period of continuous duty at the Dufferin Hospital for training in Obstetrics and Gynaecology. The course of medical study was planned to conform to the requirements of the General Medical Council of Great Britain.

After passing the Final part II examination one could register as a medical practitioner with the Burma Medical Council. The M.B., B.S. degree was registrable in India and Burma. It was also anticipated that registration in Great Britain could be made in the near future.

The internship was not compulsory but the graduates were strongly recommended to spend a year at least as a House-physician or Surgeon in a well equipped hospital in order to gain experience and confidence in solving the problems that may be encountered in general practice. Only about ten posts were available a year in selected Civil General Hospitals in Burma. They were given an allowance of 75 rupees (75 Myanmar kyats) per month. It is then raised to around 50,000 Myanmar kyats (around 55 USD) per month in 2011.

The majority of graduates entered the private practice. Few posts were available in the Government Service; the Burma Railways, the Corporation of Rangoon and certain large commercial enterprises such as the Burmah Oil Co., the Irrawaddy Flotilla Co., Burma Corporation, Indo-Burma Petroleum Co. The initial pay ranged from 200 to 400 rupees per month according to the nature of the duties and qualification of the applicants.

Starting from August 2008, UM I has started teaching new medical ethics and patient safety curriculum integrating into first MB to House Surgeon training with total hour of 36 hours.

Core contents

At the end of the 1st MB course, the student should be able to:
 Define and understand ethics, medical ethics, Hippocratic Oath, Declaration of Geneva in Burmese and English versions
 Be aware of ethical and moral issues in relation to Burmese culture
At the end of the 2nd MB course, the student should be able to:
 Choose correct statement regarding respect of dead body and specimen.
 Choose correct statement regarding research ethics
 Choose correct statement regarding informed consent
At the end of the 3rd MB course, the student should be able to:
 Be aware of biomedical ethics
 Safely handle infectious agents
 Describe rational prescribing (NNT, RRR, APR)
 Prescribe safely
 Conduct appropriate bedside manner
 Identify health care errors and their causes
 At the end of the FP I course, the student should be able to describe:
 code of conduct (medical/ethical)
 serious medical misconduct
 medical negligence (civil and criminal)
 formation and function of MMC
 professionalism
 patient safety concepts
 How to take Consent for post-mortem examination
 Public health ethics and their importance
 communication skills concerning specimen collection
 Ethical principle of respect for the death
 After the end of the Final Part II, the students should be able to:
 Demonstrate effective and ethical communications skills in patient management
 Be aware of patient safety concepts & ethical principles in clinical management decision making and ethical dilemmas
 After the end of the internship, the candidates should be able to:
 Apply patient safety concepts & ethical principles in clinical management decision making and ethical dilemmas

Notable alumni

Kyi Aye
Aye Maung Han
Kyaw Myint (physician)
Lun Htar Htar
May Win Myint
Mya Oo
Myint Maung Maung
Myo Myint
Naga Thein Hlaing
Nang Mwe San
Nay Win Maung
Pe Myint
Pe Thet Khin
Sandar Win
Saung Oo Hlaing
Sein Myint
Soe Thu
Tha Hla Shwe
Than Nyein
Tin Shwe
Phyu Phyu Kyaw Thein
Myint Htwe
Sandar Win
Sujoy B. Roy
Za Hlei Thang
S I Padmavati

Gallery

See also
 List of universities in Myanmar
 Medical Universities (Myanmar)

References

External links
Ministry of Health web site
University Official web site
Alumni of Myanmar Institutes of Medicine Association
Alumni of Myanmar Institutes of Medicine Yahoo! Group
The Forum IM-1

Universities and colleges in Yangon
Medical schools in Myanmar
Educational institutions established in 1927
1927 establishments in Burma